Trinity Episcopal Church Rectory is a historic church rectory at 430 Juliana Street in Parkersburg, Wood County, West Virginia. It is joined to the Trinity Episcopal Church located at 424 Juliana St., by a newer wing  It was built in 1863, and is a -story, painted brick building in the Second Empire style.  It features a concave profile mansard roof.

It was listed on the National Register of Historic Places in 1982.

References

Churches in Wood County, West Virginia
Episcopal churches in West Virginia
Buildings and structures in Parkersburg, West Virginia
Properties of religious function on the National Register of Historic Places in West Virginia
Clergy houses in the United States
Churches completed in 1863
Second Empire architecture in West Virginia
National Register of Historic Places in Wood County, West Virginia
19th-century Episcopal church buildings